Sir Richard Verney (1563 – 7 August 1630) of Compton Verney in Warwickshire, England, was a landowner and politician who sat in the House of Commons at various times between 1589 and 1614.

Origins
He was the eldest son of George Verney (d. 1574) of Compton Verney, by his wife Jane Lucy, daughter of William Lucy of Charlecote in Warwickshire.

Career
In 1574, aged 11, he inherited his deceased father's estates. He entered Gray's Inn in 1582 to train as a lawyer and served as a Justice of the Peace from about 1584 when he came of age aged 21. In 1589 he was elected as a Member of Parliament for Warwickshire. He was Sheriff of Warwickshire for 1590–1, during which time he became liable for a penalty of £1,000 due to the escape of an important prisoner under his custody. He was Commissioner for Musters by 1597. In 1601 he was elected as an MP for West Looe in Cornwall. He was knighted in 1603 and was Sheriff of Warwickshire again for 1604–5. He may have been an MP for Warwickshire again during the 1604 to 1611 Parliament, and was elected an MP for Warwickshire in 1614.

Marriage and issue

On 29 October 1582 at Alcester he married Margaret Greville (d. 26 March 1631), (later from 1628 suo jure 6th Baroness Willoughby de Broke) daughter of Fulke Greville, 4th Baron Willoughby de Broke (1536–1606) of Beauchamp Court, Alcester, Warwickshire, and sister and heiress of Fulke Greville, 1st Baron Brooke, 5th Baron Willoughby de Broke (1554–1628), known before 1621 as Sir Fulke Greville the poet, dramatist, and statesman. Verney was said to be an affectionate family man and a good friend and spent much of his time in the social round of visits and entertainments. He was often at Beauchamp Court, the home of his brother-in-law Sir Fulke Greville. By his wife he had four sons and four daughters, including: 
Greville Verney, 7th Baron Willoughby de Broke, eldest son and heir, who inherited the title Baron Willoughby de Broke on the death of his mother in 1631.

Death and burial
He died in 1630 at the age of 66 after a short illness and was buried in the chapel at Compton Verney, where survives his monument by Nicholas Stone, master-mason to King Charles I, comprising alabaster recumbent effigy, with that of his wife, on a chest tomb.

References

1563 births
1630 deaths
Members of the pre-1707 English Parliament for constituencies in Cornwall
Members of Gray's Inn
High Sheriffs of Warwickshire
English MPs 1589
English MPs 1601
English MPs 1604–1611
English MPs 1614
Sheriffs of Warwickshire